The 2002 Boost Mobile V8 International was the twelfth round of the 2002 V8 Supercar Championship Series. It was held on the weekend of 8 to 10 November at Pukekohe Park Raceway in New Zealand.

Race results

Qualifying

Top Ten Shootout

Race 1 

Results from Race 1 are as follows:

Race 2 

Results from Race 2 are as follows:

Race 3 

Results from Race 3 are as follows:

References

Boost Mobile
Auto races in New Zealand
Boost Mobile
November 2002 sports events in New Zealand